Pasha was a higher rank in the Ottoman political and military system, typically granted to governors, generals, dignitaries, and others. As an honorary title, Pasha, in one of its various ranks, is similar to a British peerage or knighthood, and was also one of the highest titles in the 20th-century Kingdom of Egypt. The title was also used in Morocco in the 20th century, where it denoted a regional official or governor of a district.

Etymology 
The English word "pasha" comes from Turkish  (also ). The Oxford Dictionaries attributes the origin of the English borrowing to the mid-17th century. The etymology of the Turkish word itself has been a matter of debate. Contrary to titles like emir (amīr) and bey (beg), which were established in usage much earlier, the title pasha came into Ottoman usage right after the reign of the Osman I (d. 1324), though it had been used before the Ottomans by some Anatolian Turkish rulers of the same era. Old Turkish had no fixed distinction between /b/ and /p/, and the word was spelled  still in the 15th century.

According to Josef W. Meri and Jere L. Bacharach, the word is "more than likely derived from the Persian ". The same view is held by Nicholas Ostler, who mentions that the word was formed as a shortening of the Persian word .

According to etymologist , the word is derived from Turkish  ("boy, prince"), which is cognate with Persian . Some earlier Turkish lexicographers, such as Ahmed Vefik Paşa and Mehmed Salahi, argued it was most likely derived from Turkish  or Turkish , the latter meaning "elder brother" and being a title given to some Ottoman provincial officials and janissaries.

As first used in western Europe, the title appeared in writing with the initial "b". The English forms bashaw, bassaw, bucha, etc., general in the 16th and 17th century, derive through the medieval Latin and Italian word . Due to the Ottoman presence in the Arab world, the title became used frequently in Arabic, though pronounced basha due to the absence of the /p/ sound in Arabic.

Role in Ottoman and Egyptian political system 

Within the Ottoman Empire, the Sultan had the right to bestow the title of Pasha. Lucy Mary Jane Garnett wrote in the 1904 work Turkish Life in Town and Country that it was the sole "Turkish title which carries with it any definite rank and precedence".

It was through this custom that the title came to be used in Egypt, which was conquered by the Ottomans in 1517. The rise to power in Egypt in 1805 by Muhammad Ali, an Albanian military commander, effectively established Egypt as a de facto independent state, however, it still owed technical fealty to the Ottoman Sultan. Moreover, Muhammad Ali harboured ambitions of supplanting the Osman Dynasty in Constantinople (now Istanbul), and sought to style his Egyptian realm as a successor sultanate to the Ottoman Empire. As such, he bore the title of Pasha, in addition to the official title of Wāli, and the self-declared title of Khedive. His successors to the Egyptian and Sudanese throne, Ibrahim, Abbas, Sa'id, and Isma'il also inherited these titles, with Pasha, and Wāli ceasing to be used in 1867, when the Ottoman Sultan, Abdülaziz officially recognised Isma'il as Khedive.

The title Pasha appears originally to have applied exclusively to military commanders and only high ranking family of the sultans, but subsequently it could distinguish any high official, and also unofficial persons whom the court desired to honour.

It was also part of the official style of the Kapudan Pasha (Grand Admiral of the Ottoman fleet).
Pashas ranked above Beys and Aghas, but below Khedives and Viziers.

Three grades of Pasha existed, distinguished by the number of horse tails (three, two, and one respectively; a symbol of Turco-Mongol tradition) or peacock tails that the bearers were entitled to display on their standard as a symbol of military authority when on campaign. Only the sultan himself was entitled to four tails, as sovereign commander in chief.

The following military ranks entitled the holder to the style Pasha (lower ranks were styled Bey or merely Effendi):
The Vizier-i-Azam (Grand Vizier, the prime minister, but also often taking the field as Generalissimo instead of the Sultan)
Mushir (Field marshal)
Ferik (army lieutenant-general or navy vice-admiral)
Liva (major general or rear-admiral)
The Kizlar Agha (chief black eunuch, the highest officer in the Topkapı Palace; three tails, as commander of the baltadji corps of the halberdiers in the imperial army
Constantinople's Shaikh ul-Islam, the highest Muslim clergyman, of cabinet rank.

If a Pasha governed a provincial territory, it could be called a pashaluk after his military title, besides the administrative term for the type of jurisdiction, e.g. eyalet, vilayet/walayah. Both Beylerbeys (governors-general) and valis/wālis (the most common type of Governor) were entitled to the style of Pasha (typically with two tails). The word pashalik designated any province or other jurisdiction of a Pasha, such as the Pasha or Bashaw of Tripoli.

Ottoman and Egyptian authorities conferred the title upon both Muslims and Christians without distinction. They also frequently gave it to foreigners in the service of the Ottoman Empire, or of the Egyptian Khedivate (later Sultanate, and Kingdom in turn), e.g. Hobart Pasha.

In an Egyptian context, the Abaza Family is known as "the family of the pashas" for having produced the largest number of nobles holding this title under the Muhammad Ali dynasty and was noted in Egyptian media as one of the main "families that rule Egypt" to this day, and as "deeply rooted in Egyptian society and… in the history of the country."

Honorific 
As an honorific, the title Pasha was an aristocratic title and could be hereditary or non-hereditary, stipulated in the "Firman" (patent of nobility) issued by the Sultan carrying the imperial seal "Tughra". The title did not bestow rank or title to the wife nor was any religious leader elevated to the title. In contrast to western nobility titles, where the title normally is added before the given name, Ottoman titles followed the given name. In contacts with foreign emissaries and representatives, holders of the title Pasha were often referred to as "Your Excellency".

The sons of a Pasha were styled Pashazada or Pashazade, which means just that.

In modern Egyptian and (to a lesser extent) Levantine Arabic, it is used as an honorific closer to "Sir" than "Lord", especially by older people. Among Egyptians born since the Revolution of 1952 and the abolition of aristocratic titles, it is considered a highly formal way of addressing one's male peers.

The Republican Turkish authorities abolished the title circa the 1930s. Although it is no longer an official title, high-ranking officers of the Turkish Armed Forces are often referred to as "pashas" by the Turkish public and media.

In the French Navy, "pasha" (pacha in French) is the nickname of the Commanding Officer, similar to the term "skipper" in the Anglophone  navies.

List of notable pashas 

The inclusion criterion is that the person held the rank of "pasha" in his society
 Abaza Family, Egyptian Pashas and Beys
 Abbas I of Egypt
 Abbas II of Egypt
 Ali Pasha, multiple people
 Ali Pasha Mubarak
 Andranik Pasha
 Baker Pasha (Valentine Baker)
 Barbarossa Khair ad-Din Pasha
 Bucknam Pasha (Ransford Dodsworth Bucknam)
 Ahmed Pasha (Claude Alexandre de Bonneval)
 Cigalazade Yusuf Sinan Pasha
 Djemal Pasha
 Pargalı Ibrahim Pasha ("Ibrahim Pasha of Parga"), also known as Frenk Ibrahim Pasha ("the Westerner"), Makbul Ibrahim Pasha ("the Favorite") and Maktul Ibrahim Pasha ("the Executed")
 Dragut, Ottoman Naval Commander & Pasha of Tripoli
 Emin Pasha
 Enver Pasha
 Essad Pasha Toptani
 Fakhri Pasha
 Fekry Pasha Abaza
 Fuad Pasha
 Glubb Pasha (Sir John Bagot Glubb)
 Gordon Pasha (Charles George Gordon)
 Guyon Pasha, (General Richard Guyon), also known as Kurshid Pasha
 Habib Abdoe'r Rahman Alzahier
 Hagop Kazazian Pasha
 Hajji Mustafa Pasha
 Hobart Pasha (Augustus Charles Hobart-Hampden)
 Hüseyin Tevfik Pasha, arms and algebra expert
 Hussein Refki Pasha
 Ibrahim Edhem Pasha
 İsmet Pasha (İsmet İnönü)
 Jafar al-Askari
 Jamal Pasha
 Judar Pasha, Moroccan general
 Kara Mustafa Pasha
 Hicks Pasha (William Hicks), British Colonel, Hero of the Mahdist Wars
 Kazazian Pasha
 Kilic Ali Pasha
 Multiple members of the Köprülü family
 Lala Kara Mustafa Pasha
 Liman von Sanders Pasha (Otto Liman von Sanders)
 Goltz Pasha (Colmar Freiherr von der Goltz)
 Krayem Pasha Al Nahar, Jordan
 Mahmud Dramali Pasha, Ottoman general
 Marcus Simaika Pasha,  was an Egyptian Coptic leader, politician, and founder of the Coptic Museum in Cairo
 Mehmet Esat Bülkat
 Mehmed Pasha Sokolović
 Meissner Pasha (Heinrich August Meissner)
 Melling Pasha (Antoine Ignace Melling)
 Midhat Pasha
 Müezzinzade Ali Pasha, Ottoman admiral
 Muhammad Ali Pasha, viceroy of Egypt
 Mustafa Kemal Pasha, subsequently known as Mustafa Kemal Atatürk, founder of the post-Ottoman Turkish republic
 Mustafa Reshid Pasha
 Naguib Pasha Mahfouz, is known as the father of obstetrics and gynaecology in Egypt and was a pioneer in obstetric fistula
 Nubar Pasha
 Osman Pasha
 Omar Pasha Latas
 Piyale Pasha
 Qassim Pasha Al Zuhair, Pasha of Albasrah and Kuwait
 Radu Bey, Pasha of Wallachia, Brother of Vlad III Tepes
 Refet Bele
 Regep Aga
 Riyad Pasha, Egyptian statesman
 Russell Pasha, British officer in the Egyptian police
 Rüstem Pasha the longest serving Grand Vizier of the Ottoman Empire
 Said Pasha
 Şerif Pasha, Kurdish nationalist
 Sentot Prawirodirdjo, known as "Alibasah Sentot" or "Sentot Ali Pasha". Javanese Muslim commander during Java War
 Sinan Pasha,
 Stone Pasha (Charles Pomeroy Stone)
 Sulejman Pasha
 Sultan al-Atrash
 Tahir Pasha, vali of Mosul 1910-12
 Talat Pasha
 Tawfiq Bay (Tevfik Pasha), Arab pan-Islamist
 Tewfik Pasha
 Turhan Pasha Përmeti
 Tusun Pasha
 Urabi Pasha
 Vartan Pasha
 Wehib Pasha
 Williams Pasha (Sir William Williams), Canadian/British General
 Woods Pasha (Henry Felix Woods)
 Youssef Wahba Pasha, Egyptian Prime Minister
 Yusuf Murad Pasha (Józef Bem), Polish general and a national hero of Poland and Hungary, who served in the Ottoman Empire.
 Yusuf Karamanli, Pasha of Tripoli
 Zulfikar family, Egyptian Pashas and Beys

See also 
 List of Ottoman titles and appellations

Notes

References 

 

 
Noble titles of Egypt
Noble titles
Ottoman titles
Titles in Iran
Titles in Lebanon
Titles of national or ethnic leadership
Turkish titles
Turkish words and phrases
Bengali Muslim surnames
Titles in Bosnia and Herzegovina during Ottoman period